|}

The Betway Bowl is a Grade 1 National Hunt steeplechase in Great Britain which is open to horses aged five years or older. It is run at Aintree over a distance of about 3 miles and 1 furlong (3 miles and 210 yards, or ), and during its running there are nineteen fences to be jumped. The race is scheduled to take place each year in early April.

History
The event was established in 1984, and it was originally designed as a consolation prize for horses which were beaten or had been unable to participate in the previous month's Cheltenham Gold Cup. The inaugural running was backed by Perrier-Jouët, and it was titled the Perrier-Jouët Champagne Cup. For the following three years it was sponsored by Whitbread and called the Whitbread Gold Label Cup.

Subsequent sponsors have included Martell (the Martell Cup, the Martell Cognac Cup) and Betfair (the Betfair Bowl). Totesport began supporting the event as the Totesport Bowl in 2008 and the sponsorship was taken over by Betfred in 2012 after that company purchased The Tote in 2011. Betway took over sponsorship from the 2017 running.

The race was promoted to Grade 1 status in 2010. It is currently held on the opening day of the three-day Grand National meeting.

Records
Most successful horse (2 wins):
 Wayward Lad – 1985, 1987
 Docklands Express – 1993, 1994
 First Gold – 2001, 2003
 Silviniaco Conti – 2014, 2015
 Clan Des Obeaux - 2021, 2022

Leading jockey (2 wins):
 Richard Dunwoody – Aquilifer (1991), Docklands Express (1994)
 Thierry Doumen – First Gold (2001, 2003)
 Tony McCoy – Tiutchev (2004), Exotic Dancer (2007)
 Timmy Murphy – Celestial Gold (2006), Our Vic (2008)
 Noel Fehily – Silviniaco Conti (2014, 2015)
 Paddy Brennan – Nacarat (2011), Cue Card (2016)
 Ruby Walsh - What A Friend (2010), Kemboy (2019)
 Harry Cobden - Clan Des Obeaux (2021, 2022)

Leading trainer (6 wins):
 Paul Nicholls – See More Business (2000), What a Friend (2010), Silviniaco Conti (2014, 2015), Clan Des Obeaux (2021, 2022)

Winners

See also
 Horse racing in Great Britain
 List of British National Hunt races
 Recurring sporting events established in 1984  – this race is included under its original title, Perrier-Jouët Champagne Cup.

References

 Racing Post:

 aintree.co.uk – 2010 John Smith's Grand National Media Guide.
 pedigreequery.com – Bowl Chase – Aintree.

External links
 Race Recordings 

National Hunt races in Great Britain
Aintree Racecourse
National Hunt chases
1984 establishments in England